Thea Aichbichler Mohr (21 August 1889 – 25 June 1957) was a German actress. She appeared in more than thirty films from 1934 to 1957.

Selected filmography

References

External links 

1889 births
1957 deaths
German film actresses